Hypophracta is a genus of moths in the family Geometridae. It is considered a synonym of Conolophia.

References

Desmobathrinae